Survivors' Insurance (Agriculture) Convention, 1933 (shelved) is  an International Labour Organization Convention.

It was established in 1933:
Having decided upon the adoption of certain proposals with regard to compulsory widows' and orphans' insurance,...

Modification 
The concepts included in the convention were revised and included in ILO Convention C128, Invalidity, Old-Age and Survivors' Benefits Convention, 1967.

Ratifications
Prior to it being shelved, the convention was ratified by ten states.

References

External links 
Text of the convention
List of countries that ratified the convention

Agricultural insurance
Shelved International Labour Organization conventions
Agriculture in society
Treaties concluded in 1933
Treaties entered into force in 1949
Agricultural treaties